All Fools Day is the seventh album by the Australian music group The Saints released in 1986.  The album was The Saints' commercial breakthrough into the US, with the videos for "Just Like Fire Would" and "Temple of the Lord" receiving airplay on MTV.

Track listing
All tracks composed by Chris Bailey; additional arrangements by Arturo Larizza and Roger Cawkwell
"Just Like Fire Would" - 3:24
"First Time" - 3:40
"Hymn to Saint Jude" - 3:33
"See You In Paradise" - 4:20
"Love or Imagination" - 3:48
"Celtic Ballad" - 2:51
"Empty Page" - 3:30
"Big Hits (On the Underground)" - 3:07
"How to Avoid Disaster" - 2:48
"Blues on My Mind" - 2:59
"Temple of the Lord" - 3:44
"All Fools Day" - 4:50

Charts

Personnel
The Saints
Chris Bailey - vocals
Richard Burgman - guitar
Arturo Larizza - bass
Ivor Hay - drums

Production

Hugh Jones - Engineer, Mix Engineer, Producer
Neill King - Mix Engineer
Chris Bailey - Producer

References

The Saints (Australian band) albums
1986 albums
Albums produced by Hugh Jones (producer)
Mushroom Records albums
Albums recorded at Rockfield Studios